Ceratopachys is a genus of African seed bugs in the tribe Homoeocerini, erected by John Obadiah Westwood in 1842.

Species
The Coreoidea Species File lists:
 Ceratopachys nigricornis (Germar, 1838)
 Ceratopachys virescens Dallas, 1852

References

External links
 

Coreidae genera